The 1974 Medi-Quik Open, also known as the Eastern Lawn Tennis Open, was a men's tennis tournament played on outdoor grass courts at the Orange Lawn Tennis Club in South Orange, New Jersey in the United States. It was classified as a Group B category tournament and was part of the 1974 Grand Prix circuit. It was the fifth edition of the tournament on the Grand Prix circuit and was held from August 19 through August 25, 1974. Second-seeded Alex Metreveli won the singles title.

Finals

Singles
 Alex Metreveli defeated  Jimmy Connors walkover
 It was Metreveli's only singles title of the year and the 9th and last of his career.

Doubles
 Brian Gottfried /  Raúl Ramírez defeated  Anand Amritraj /  Vijay Amritraj 7–6, 6–7, 7–6

References

External links
 ITF – South Orange tournament edition details

South Orange Open
South Orange Open
South Orange Open
South Orange Open
Tennis tournaments in New Jersey
South Orange Open